Pequotsepos Manor, known formally as Denison Homestead, is a historic house museum at 120 Pequotsepos Road in the Stonington part of Mystic, Connecticut. The house was built in 1717, and stands on land that has been in continuous ownership of the Denison family since 1654.  It is now owned and operated by the family-run Denison Society, and was added to the National Register of Historic Places on June 15, 1979.

Description
The Denison Homestead is located in a rural setting of eastern Mystic, on Pequotsepos Road roughly midway between Mistuxet Avenue and Jerry Browne Road. The house is set facing south on the north side of a bend in the road. It is a -story timber-frame structure, with a gabled roof, central chimney, and shingled exterior, and is set mainly on a rock ledge, with only a small basement area in one corner. The main facade is five bays wide, with the entrance at the center. The door itself dates to about 1800, but is mounted using original iron strap hinges. The interior follows a central chimney plan, with a narrow entry vestibule that also houses a winding stair. There are parlor spaces on either side of the chimney, with the kitchen behind.

History
The house was built in 1717 by George Denison(1690-1777), and was the third Denison-built house to stand on the property, which had been granted to an older George Denison (1620-1694) in 1654. George Denison(1620-1694) at first built a primitive home and later built his "grate"house". This home burned on the eve of his grandsons wedding night and so the grandson George Denison(1690-1777) rebuilt the home even using some of the salvaged timber from his grandfathers home during rebuilding.  The Denison Society was established in 1930 and took over the Manor in 1941. In 1946, architect J. Frederick Kelly restored the house as a museum. The manor underwent additional renovations beginning in 2006.

See also
National Register of Historic Places listings in New London County, Connecticut

References

External links
 Denison Homestead - official site

Houses on the National Register of Historic Places in Connecticut
Houses completed in 1717
Houses in New London County, Connecticut
Mystic, Connecticut
Museums in New London County, Connecticut
Historic house museums in Connecticut
National Register of Historic Places in New London County, Connecticut
1717 establishments in Connecticut